2015 Siirt bombing was a bombing targeting an armoured vehicle with personnels of Turkish Gendarmerie in it in Şirvan - Pervari road of Siirt Province on 19 August 2015, around 14:10 with a bomb that was placed on the road several hours before the detonation. 8 people died and 1 was injured as a result of the attack. No one has claimed responsibility, but Turkish government has blamed Kurdistan Workers' Party (PKK) for the attack.

References 

2015 in Turkey
Kurdish–Turkish conflict (2015–present)
Mass murder in 2015
Terrorist incidents in Turkey
History of Siirt Province
August 2015 events in Turkey
Kurdistan Workers' Party attacks
Terrorist incidents in Turkey in 2015